Kazakhstan–Palestine relations are the bilateral relations between Kazakhstan and Palestine. Diplomatic relations were established on 10 April 1992. Both countries are members of the Organisation of Islamic Cooperation. Palestine has an embassy in the capital Astana. Kazakhstan is represented in Palestine by its embassy in Amman, Jordan.

History 
PLO chairman Yasser Arafat first visited Kazakhstan in December 1991.

References 

Palestine
Bilateral relations of the State of Palestine